Pseudathyma sibyllina, the Sibylline false sergeant, is a butterfly in the family Nymphalidae. It is found in Guinea, Sierra Leone, Liberia, Ivory Coast, Ghana, and Nigeria. The habitat consists of forests.

References

Butterflies described in 1890
Pseudathyma
Butterflies of Africa